The Ellenroad Ring Mill Engine is a preserved stationary steam engine in Newhey, Greater Manchester, England. It powered the Ellenroad Ring Mill from 1917, and after the mill's closure the engine is still worked under steam as a museum display.

At 3000 hp, the twin tandem compound steam engine is possibly the most powerful of the type in preservation. The two engines are named Victoria and Alexandra, multiple ropes around the flywheel drove the line shafts on each floor of the mill which in turn drove the ring spinning frames.

In addition to the mill engine, the museum also houses in operational condition the original Ellenroad mill pilot generator engine and sprinkler pump, the Whitelees Beam Engine, and the Irene Engine. The museum trust also owns the surviving components of the Fern Mill Engine, which it hopes eventually to restore to working condition.

See also
List of mills in Lancashire
List of mills in Rochdale
List of mills in Oldham

References

External links
 Ellenroad Steam Museum website
 Engine video on Flickr

Preserved stationary steam engines
Steam museums in England
Museums in Greater Manchester